Emperor Xiaohe may refer to:

Emperor He of Han (79–106)
Emperor Zhongzong of Tang (656–710)
Liu Jun (Northern Han) (926–968)